Tom Budin is an Australian DJ and record producer based in Sydney, Australia. He is known for officially remixing songs for musicians such as Lost Frequencies, Zedd, Britney Spears, G-Eazy and Timmy Trumpet.

Career 
Budin has released singles such as "Bad Vibe", "Heard Right", "Price on Love" and "Reckless" with collaborators WHTKD, J-Trick, Jack Wilby and Miles Graham respectively. In 2016, he released a song named "Mike Baird", which mocked and protested against the Sydney lockout laws, which were introduced in February 2014, two months before Baird became the Premier of New South Wales.

In 2018, his song "X with U" with British singer Luciana had charted on the Billboard Dance Club Songs chart at number one in the first week of the year.

Discography

Singles

Charted singles

Other singles

Remixes
Remixes adapted from Budin's SoundCloud page.

2013
Zedd featuring Foxes – "Clarity" (Tom Budin Remix)

2014
Jennifer Hudson featuring R. Kelly – "Its Your World" (Tom Budin Remix)
The Bloody Beetroots featuring Peter Frampton – "The Beat" (Tom Budin Remix)
Peking Duk – "Feels Like" (Tom Budin Remix)

2015
Husky featuring Natalie Wood – "Next To You" (Tom Budin Remix)
Lost Frequencies – "Are You With Me" (Tom Budin Remix)
Rob Pix featuring Barry Tones – "Jack That" (Tom Budin Remix)
Panzer Flower featuring Hubert Tubbs – "We Are Beautiful" (Tom Budin Remix)
Tchami – "After Life" featuring Stacy Barthe (Tom Budin Remix)

2016
Dave Audé and Luciana – "Yeah Yeah" (Tom Budin Remix)
Offaiah – "Trouble" (Tom Budin Remix)
Britney Spears featuring G–Eazy – "Make Me" (Tom Budin Remix)
Joel Fletcher featuring Miracle – "Mufasa" (Tom Budin Remix)
JDG and Samual James featuring Karra – "Dynasty" (Tom Budin Remix)

2017
L'Tric – "The Way You Are" (Tom Budin Remix)
Kronic and Leon Thomas – "Rendezvous" (Tom Budin Remix)
Torren Foot – "Love Me" (Tom Budin Remix)
Mashd N Kutcher featuring Park Avenue – "Pretend" (Tom Budin Remix)
Timmy Trumpet and Qulinez – "Satellites" (Tom Budin Remix)
Scndl – "Find My Way" (Tom Budin Remix)

2019
Secret Spade – "Over You" (Tom Budin Remix)
Young Bombs – "Starry Eyes" (Tom Budin Remix)
Loui PL - "Right Here" (Tom Budin Remix)
DJ Cruz - "No Problems" (Tom Budin Remix)

2020
Lost Frequencies, Zonderling and Kelvin Jones - "Love To Go" (Tom Budin Remix)

2021
Tchami featuring Stacy Barthe - "Rebirth" (Tom Budin Remix)

References 

Australian DJs
Living people
Musicians from Sydney
Australian electronic musicians
Future house musicians
Electronic dance music DJs
Year of birth missing (living people)